MAS Pydna Kitros F.C. was a Greek football club, based in Kitros, Pieria.

The club was founded in 1977. In 2017 summer, its TIN was bought by agents that wanted to create a new team in Volos. The new club was named Volos N.F.C.

Honors

Domestic Titles and honors
 Greek Football Amateur Cup: 1
 2015-16
 Eps Pieria Champions: 2
 2004-05, 2014–15
 Eps Pieria Cup Winners: 3
 2005-06, 2014–15, 2015–16

Defunct football clubs in Greece
Football clubs in Central Macedonia
Association football clubs established in 1977
1977 establishments in Greece
Pieria (regional unit)